Syvert Tobiassen Messel (22 July 1897 – 3 July 1978) was a Norwegian politician for the Liberal Party.

He was elected to the Norwegian Parliament from Vest-Agder in 1950, but was not re-elected in 1954.

Messel was born in Oddernes and was involved in local politics in Oddernes and its successor municipality Kristiansand, as well as Vest-Agder county council. He was deputy mayor of Oddernes from 1934 to 1945 and mayor from 1945 to 1964.

References

1897 births
1978 deaths
Liberal Party (Norway) politicians
Members of the Storting
20th-century Norwegian politicians